Gurpreet Singh is a male Indian racewalker from northern state of Punjab in India. Gurpreet Singh competed and won the men's 50 km race walk event at the 8th Indian National Championships. Gurpreet completed the race in three hours, 59 minutes and 42 seconds.

He has been qualified for the Tokyo Olympics 2020.

References

Living people
Indian male racewalkers
Athletes (track and field) at the 2020 Summer Olympics
Olympic athletes of India
1984 births
3.In the national championship held in Ranchi earlier in February, this year he grabbed the first position after completing the race in 3:59:42. Incidentally, this is personal best as well. Previously the army man had clinched a silver medal in the 50km event at the 7th National Race Walking Championship